Cédula Ciudadano is a 2000 film directed by Venezuelan filmmaker Diego Velasco.

Plot 
Teenager Gustavo Pérez needs to get an official stamp on his identity document in order to avoid the military draft, having to face his country's bureaucracy.

Cast 
 Héctor Palma
 Luis Colmenares
 Dimas González
 Rolando Padilla
 Benjamín Rausseo
 Orlando Urdaneta

Production 
The film was shot in several places of Caracas, including the old building of El Universal newspaper, the Candelaria Square, La Carlota airbase and the Simón Rodríguez Library. It was partially funded by the Autonomous National Center of Filmmaking.

Awards 

In 2000 Cédula Ciudadano was awarded as the Best Short Film in the Jackson Crossroads Film Festival, in the Nashville Film Festival and in the Los Angeles Latino International Film Festival. The same year it was also pre-selected for an Academy Awards nomination. In Venezuela, Cédula Ciudadano was received several awards in the 2001 Manuel Trujillo Durán Film Festival, including the Silver Award and for Best Direction, Production and Actor.

References

External links 
 Cédula Ciudadano at FilmAffinity
 
 

2000 films
2000s Spanish-language films
2000 comedy films
2000s screwball comedy films
Films shot in Venezuela
Venezuelan comedy films
Venezuelan short films
Comedy short films